The Living Museum of Bujumbura is a zoo and museum in Burundi. The museum is located in Bujumbura, the country's largest city and former capital, and is one of the country's two public museums. It is dedicated to the wildlife and art of Burundi.

The museum was founded in 1977 and occupies a  park on the rue du 13 Octobre in downtown Bujumbura. In December 2016, the zoo's collection included six crocodiles, one monkey, one leopard, two chimpanzees, three guinea fowls, a tortoise, an antelope, and a number of snakes and fish. A number of Burundian craftsmen also have workshops on the museum's premises. Several different types of trees stand in the park, alongside a reconstruction of a traditional Burundian house (rugo).

The number of visitors to the museum fell sharply in the aftermath of the 2015 Burundian unrest, following a wider decline in the number of tourists to the country.

References

External links

Le Musée Vivant (Bujumbura) at Petit Futé
The City's Museum (Musée Vivant) at Burundi Safari

Museums in Burundi
Bujumbura
Zoos
1977 establishments in Burundi
Museums established in 1977
Arboreta
Zoos established in 1977